Mandeer is a town and union council of Gujrat District, in the Punjab province of Pakistan. It is part of Kharian Tehsil and is located at 32°46'0N 73°50'0E with an altitude of 256 metres (843 feet).
  
The majority of the population belongs to Jatt tribe.  Until the late 1970s agriculture and army were the only fields where the people were working. Agriculture is a forgotten profession nowadays. Small land holdings and no proper source of irrigation have forced people to look for alternatives. From then on till mid-1990s Middle East was the favourite destination for the workers.  But now people from Mandeer are working and living in Europe, mainly Denmark, Norway, France and UK. 
This make Mandeer one of the richest village of Pakistan.
 Many are well settled and living with their families in Europe and U.S.A.

Geography

References

Union councils of Gujrat District
Populated places in Gujrat District